Pliskov may refer to:

 Pliska, a small village, and the historical capital of Bulgaria
 Plyskiv, Ukraine, a village in Vinnytsia Oblast, Ukraine

See also
 Plíšek, a surname, one of whose feminine variants is Plíškova